Kavalam Madhava Panikkar (3 June 1895 – 10 December 1963), popularly known as Sardar K. M. Panikkar, was an Indian statesman and diplomat. He was also a professor, newspaper editor, historian and novelist. He was born in Travancore, then a princely state in the British Indian Empire and was educated in Madras and at the University of Oxford.

After a stint as professor at Aligarh Muslim University and later at University of Calcutta, he became editor of Hindustan Times in 1925. Later, he was appointed Secretary to the Chamber of Princes, whence he moved to Patiala State and then to Bikaner State as Foreign Minister and later became the latter's Prime Minister. When India achieved political independence, Sardar Madhava Panikkar represented the country at the 1947 session of the UN General Assembly. In 1950, he was appointed Ambassador of India (the first non-Socialist country to recognise People's Republic of China) to China. After a successful tenure there, he went as Ambassador to Egypt in 1952. He was appointed a member of the States Reorganisation Commission set up in 1953. He was also India's Ambassador to France and a member of Rajya Sabha, the upper house of the Indian parliament. He also served as Vice-Chancellor of the University of Kashmir and the University of Mysore.

Early life and education
Madhava Panikkar was born to Puthillathu Parameswaran Namboodiri and Chalayil Kunjikutti Kunjamma in the princely state of Travancore in 1895. He completed his basic studies at CMS College School, Kottayam and St. Paul's School, Vepery, Madras. Later on he joined Madras Christian College for intermediate classes. At MCC he was a contemporary of Puthezhath Raman Menon, Nandyelath Padmanabha Menon and Sadasiva Reddy among others. He left for England in April 1914 to read history at Christ Church, University of Oxford. After leaving Oxford, Panikkar read for the bar at the Middle Temple, London.

He was the first president of the Kerala Sahitya Academy. After his studies, Panikkar travelled to Portugal and Holland to research the involvement of these countries with Malabar, the results of which were published in the books Malabar and the Portuguese (1929) and Malabar and the Dutch (1931).
 He was the maternal uncle of the noted poet, dramatist and lyricist Kavalam Narayana Panicker.

Career
On returning to India, he first taught at the Aligarh Muslim University and later at the University of Calcutta. He turned to journalism in 1925 as editor of the Hindustan Times.

For the next 20 years, Madhava Panikkar served the Princely States, becoming secretary to the chancellor of the Chamber of Princes. He also served as the foreign minister of the state of Patiala and as foreign minister of Bikaner, and became the dewan of Bikaner in 1944. He served in China until 1952, building a relationship with Chiang Kai-shek, and remaining there through the Communist takeover in 1949 and the following period. He wrote of his experiences in the book In Two Chinas (1955). This period also saw the completion of his work Asia and Western Dominance (1953). He subsequently served as ambassador to Egypt (1952–1953), and France (1956–1959), before a severe stroke forced him to return to India. On recovering, he took up his academic career again, becoming Vice-Chancellor of Jammu and Kashmir University and later of Mysore University. During his political career Panikkar continued to publish articles and poems, and also translated several Greek plays into Malayalam verse. He was a nominated member of Rajya Sabha from 1959 - 1961.

Academics and scholarship
Early on Madhava Panikkar had cultivated an interest in Malayalam literature, and was a lifelong friend of the poet Vallathol Narayana Menon. He published scholarly works extensively and worked on ancient Indian history and more recent historical developments. Cambridge historian Arthur Hassall wrote that in his "long career as tutor of history at Christ Church" he had "never had a more brilliant student." Madhava Panikkar's interests stretched into diverse fields such as, art, notably novels, poetry and Kathakali and he wrote equally well in both Malayalam and English and published over 50 books and numerous articles.

Madhava Panikkar's interest in European influence on Asia was reflected in his studies of the Portuguese and the Dutch in Malabar (in South India) and especially in his Asia and Western Dominance (1953). In Two Chinas (1955) revealed his sympathy with Communist China.

Bibliography
Notable works in English:

1920: Essays on Educational Reconstruction in India
1922: Sri Harsha of Kanauj: a monograph on the history of India in the first half of the 7th century A. D.
1923: Indian Nationalism: its origin, history, and ideals
1928: The Working of Dyarchy in India, 1919–1928
1929: The Evolution of British Policy towards Indian States, 1774–1858
1929: Malabar and the Portuguese: being a history of the relations of the Portuguese with Malabar from 1500 to 1663
1930: The Founding of the Kashmir State: a biography of Maharajah Gulab Singh, 1792–1858
1930: Federal India
1932: Indian States and the Government of India
1934: The New Empire: letters to a Conservative Member of Parliament on the future of England and India
1936: The Indian Princes in Council: a record of the chancellorship of His Highness, the Maharaja of Patiala, 1926–1931 and 1933–1936
1937: His Highness the Maharaja of Bikaner: a biography
1938: Hinduism and the modern world
1942: The States and the Constitutional Settlement
1943: Indian States
1944: The Strategic Problems of the Indian Ocean
1945: India and the Indian Ocean: an essay on the influence of sea power on Indian history
1947: India through the Ages
1953: Asia and Western Dominance: a survey of the Vasco Da Gama epoch of Asian history, 1498–1945
1954: A Survey of Indian History
1954: In Two Chinas: memoirs of a diplomat
1956: The Principles and Practice of Diplomacy
1957: Voice of Truth, a topical symposium: replies to attacks on Christians and missionaries in India
1957: India and China: a study of cultural relations
1958: The Determining Periods of Indian History
1960: A History of Kerala, 1498–1801
1960: The State and the Citizen
1961: Hindu Society at Cross Roads
1961: Essential Features of India Culture
1962: In Defence of Liberalism
1963: Studies in Indian History
1963: The Ideas of Sovereignty and State in Indian Political Thought
1963: The Foundations of New India
1963: The Himalayas in Indian Life
1964: A Survey of Indian History
1964: Hinduism & the West: a study in challenge and response
1964: The Serpent and the Crescent: a history of the Negro empires of western Africa
1965: Lectures on India's Contact with the World in the pre-British Period
1966: The Twentieth Century
1967: Caste and Democracy & Prospects of Democracy in India
1969: Geographical Factors in Indian History
1977: An Autobiography

See also
Navtej Sarna
Taranjit Singh Sandhu
Harsh Vardhan Shringla

References

External links

The Hindu Reformation K. M. Panikkar
The Principle and Practices of Diplomacy K. M. Panikkar
A tribute to smaller states; The Hindu
Sardar K. M. Panikkar biography; Kerala Sahitya Akademi (in Malayalam)

1895 births
1963 deaths
Administrators in the princely states of India
Academic staff of the University of Calcutta
Ambassadors of India to Egypt
Ambassadors of India to China
Ambassadors of India to France
Historians of India
Indian barristers
Indian civil servants
Indian dewans
20th-century Indian historians
Malayali people
Alumni of Christ Church, Oxford
Academic staff of the University of Mysore
Nominated members of the Rajya Sabha
Academic staff of Aligarh Muslim University
Scientists from Kerala
20th-century Indian lawyers
People of the Kingdom of Travancore
20th-century Indian writers
Writers from Kerala
People from Kottayam district
CMS College Kottayam alumni
Academic staff of the University of Kashmir